Casa-Port Railway Terminal is an ONCF ("Moroccan National Railway") station in the centre of Casablanca, near the Port of Casablanca.

Layout 
The station is a terminus, with 6 tracks and 4 platforms. Most notably, it is served by the Train Navette Rapide (TNR) from Casablanca to Kénitra via Rabat.

Renovation  

The terminal went through a renovation from 2008 to September 2014. ONCF's total investment is around 100 million MAD.

During the renovation, access to the platforms was via a temporary passenger building on the Boulevard Moulay Abderrahmane. Boarding and alighting points were moved to allow train movements without interruption to other traffic.

After the works are complete, the station will comprise 8 tracks with 5 platforms and have a capacity of 20 trains per hour (t.p.h.), handling 10,000 passengers a day.

The reconstruction works had several setbacks. The initial plan for the works, managed by the ONCF with AREP/Groupe 3A as contractors, was for them to end in 2012, then in 2013. The trickiest part of the construction was new underground levels in unstable soil, close to the sea – in 2010 the whole site was flooded – and the contractor's failure, which meant re-tendering to a wider market of larger contractors. 
Despite multiple delays in the construction project, the brand new railway station was inaugurated on 25 September 2014 in the presence of King Mohammed VI.

Local transport 
The station is accessible by taxi.

References

External links  
 Official website of ONCF

Railway stations in Casablanca
Buildings and structures in Casablanca
Transport in Casablanca
Railway stations opened in 1907
Railway stations serving harbours and ports
20th-century architecture in Morocco